Danny Barnes is a former professional rugby league footballer who played in the 1990s.

Club career
Danny Barnes played for Halifax in 1999's Super League IV.

References

External links
Stanley Rangers ARLFC - Roll of Honour

Halifax R.L.F.C. players
Living people
English rugby league players
Place of birth missing (living people)
Rugby league hookers
Year of birth missing (living people)